Stephen Salonga Tomusange was an Anglican bishop who served in Uganda during the second half of the 20th century.

Russell was educated at King's College Budo and Buwalasi Theological College. He was ordained deacon in 1936 and priest in 1938. He served in the Diocese of the Upper Nile and was its Assistant Bishop from 1952 to 1961 (he was also Archdeacon of Teso from 1959).  He was translated to Soroti in 1961;  and again to West Buganda in 1965 (where he was also Dean. Tomusange retired in 1974.

References

20th-century Anglican bishops in Uganda
Anglican bishops on the Upper Nile
Anglican bishops of Soroti
Anglican bishops of West Buganda
Alumni of Christ's College, Cambridge
Alumni of Ridley Hall, Cambridge
Anglican archdeacons in Africa
Anglican deans in Africa
People educated at King's College Budo
Bulwalasi Theological College alumni
Ugandan Anglican bishops